Pristimantis parectatus is a species of frog in the family Strabomantidae. It is endemic to Colombia where it is found on the eastern flank of the Cordillera Central in the Antioquia and Caldas Departments.
Its natural habitats are high-altitude ( asl) Andean cloud forests. It is threatened by habitat loss caused by agricultural development.

References

parectatus
Endemic fauna of Colombia
Amphibians of Colombia
Amphibians of the Andes
Amphibians described in 1998
Taxonomy articles created by Polbot